Vasilis Lolos (Greek: Βασίλης Λώλος) is a Greek comic book artist known for his work on The Pirates of Coney Island for Image and 5, a self-published multi-national anthology. He also assisted My Chemical Romance in designing some of the elements for their Danger Days/Killjoys phase.

Bibliography
Interior comic work includes:
Omikron ROM-Zine (script and art, self-published DVD/CD-Rom and comic zine, 2002–2003)
9 (script and art, a weekly comics anthology supplement for Ελευθεροτυπία newspaper):
 "The Freakshow" (2003)
 "DeathPop" (2003–2004)
 "Cyberpink" (2004)
Γεννήτρια (script and art, graphic novel, Giganto Books, 2004)
SUBart vol. 2 #2-3 (of 4 produced) (script and art, anthology, Giganto Books, 2004)
GIN 474 #0: "ZomgZ" (script and art, self-published anthology with Vasilis Bibas and Ilias Kyriazis, 2005)
Flight Volume 2: "Heads Up" (co-writer, script and art by Becky Cloonan, anthology graphic novel, Image, 2005)
nebuli (script and art, with Becky Cloonan, self-published, 2006)
Hats #1-2 (script and art, self-published, 2006–2007)
 In 2011, remixed and re-published as a webcomic through MTV Geek.
 In 2014, re-titled Maximum Overdrive and sold digitally - issue #1 through Comixology, #2 through Deth Grip.
East Coast Rising Volume 1 (colours only, script and art by Becky Cloonan, graphic novel, Tokyopop, 2006)
24Seven Volume 1: "The Chelsea" (with Rick Spears, anthology graphic novel, Image, 2006)
Blast! Comics: "Δαυλός" (with Steve Papas, anthology graphic novel, Giganto Books, 2006)
The Pirates of Coney Island #1-6 (of 8) (with Rick Spears, Image, 2006–2007)
The Last Call Volume 1-2 (script and art, graphic novel, Oni Press, 2007–2013)
5 (with Becky Cloonan, Rafael Grampá, Gabriel Bá and Fábio Moon, self-published anthology, 2007)
Spider-Man Family #2: "Building a Better Lizard" (with Paul Benjamin, anthology, Marvel,  2007)
Wolverine: Firebreak: "Little White Lies" (with Macon Blair, co-feature in one-shot,  Marvel, 2008)
Pixu: the Mark of Evil #1-2 (script and art, with Becky Cloonan, Gabriel Bá and Fábio Moon, self-published, 2008)
The Nightmare Factory Volume 2: "Gas Station Carnivals" (with Joe Harris, anthology graphic novel, Fox Atomic, 2008)
Buffy the Vampire Slayer: Tales of the Vampires: "The Thrill" (with Becky Cloonan, one-shot,  Dark Horse, 2009)
Northlanders #17: "The Viking Art of Single Combat" (with Brian Wood, Vertigo, 2009)
The UNdroid (script and art, self-published, 2009)
Superbadmanners (script and art, webcomic, So Comic, 2012)
Conan the Barbarian vol. 2 #8-9: "Border Fury" (with Brian Wood, Dark Horse, 2012)
Satan is Alive: A Tribute to Mercyful Fate: "Egypt" (script and art, anthology graphic novel by Mark Rudolph, 2012)
Once Upon a Time: Shadow of the Queen: "Chapter Two" (with Corinna Bechko and Dan Thomsen, anthology graphic novel, Marvel, 2013)
American McGee's Akaneiro #1-3: "The Path of Cloak and Wolf" (with Justin Aclin, Dark Horse, 2013)
Ελευθεροτυπία: "Σεριφης Μπλαντ" (script and art, six episodes of weekly comic strip, 2013)
Thrashers (script and art, webcomic, 2013)
Starchild (script and art, webcomic, 2013)
I Was a Preteen Alice Cooper (script and art, webcomic, VICE, 2014)
Odysseia3000 (script and art, webcomic, 2014–2015)
Morbid Tales!: An Illustrated Tribute to Celtic Frost: "Untitled" (script and art, anthology graphic novel by Mark Rudolph, 2014)
Bartkira Volume 3 pages 266-267 (after Katsuhiro Otomo and Matt Groening, Internet art project, 2015)
The Gate (script and art, self-published, 2016)
Halo: Tales from the Slipspace: "Something Has Happened" (with Alex Irvine, anthology graphic novel, Dark Horse, 2016)

References

Interviews

External links

Year of birth missing (living people)
Living people
Greek comics artists